Filmworks XXV: City of Slaughter/Schmatta/Beyond the Infinite is an album of solo piano pieces composed by John Zorn and performed by Zorn, Omri Mor and Rob Burger which was recorded in New York City in 2009 and 2012 and released on the Tzadik label in January 2013. The album was the last in Zorn's Filmworks series.

Reception

Allmusic said  "This is a beautiful recording by virtually any standard". Martin Schray stated "All in all these are typical Zorn compositions presented in an unusual context".

Track listing
All compositions by John Zorn
 "The End of Tradition" - 3:40   
 "The Oath" - 2:13   
 "Modernity" - 1:27   
 "Island/Ghetto" - 2:34   
 "New Choices" - 2:10   
 "Revolution" - 3:32   
 "New Currents" - 2:43   
 "Loss" - 1:53   
 "Hopes and Dreams" - 1:33   
 "The Bund" - 2:32   
 "City of Slaughter" - 4:44   
 "Anti-Semitism/Pogrom" - 1:24   
 "Pale of Settlement" - 3:03   
 "Requiem" - 2:52   
 "Schmatta" - 1:40   
 "Pins and Needles" - 3:12   
 "Collapse" - 3:06   
 "Hanging by a Thread" - 2:58   
 "Beyond the Infinite" - 8:19

Personnel
John Zorn (tracks 15-18), Omri Mor (tracks 1-14), Rob Burger (track 19) - piano

Production
Marc Urselli - engineer, audio mixer
John Zorn and Kazunori Sugiyama – producers

References
 

2013 soundtrack albums
John Zorn soundtracks
Albums produced by John Zorn
Tzadik Records soundtracks